Mythimna scottii is a moth of the family Noctuidae. It has been recorded from Australia (Queensland, the Northern Territory and Western Australia), Fiji, New Caledonia and Hawaii. But it has been listed as a Species inquirenda and might prove to be a synonym.

References

External links
Descriptions of 21 new genera and 103 new species of Lepidoptera-Heterocera from the Australian Region

Mythimna (moth)
Moths described in 1886
Moths of Oceania